Sir Thomas Glen Glen-Coats, 1st Baronet,  (19 February 1846 – 12 July 1922) was a Scottish businessman and Liberal Party politician.

Glen-Coats was a Director of the thread-making firm of J. & P. Coats. He was created a Baronet, of Ferguslie Park in the Parish of Abbey in the County of Renfrew, in 1894. He stood for Renfrewshire West in 1900 but narrowly lost.

However, he narrowly won the seat in 1906,

He stood down in January 1910. He was also Lord Lieutenant of Renfrewshire between 1908 and 1922. He was awarded the Volunteer Decoration in 1892.

He took the additional name of Glen before that of Coats by Royal Licence when he was created a baronet. The name Glen comes from his mother's family and his first cousin, Matthew Arthur, 1st Baron Glenarthur, likewise added Glen when he was raised to the peerage.

He is buried with his family at the summit of Woodside Cemetery in western Paisley.

Family
Thomas Glen-Coats married Elise Agnes Walker (1855-1910), daughter of Alexander Walker, Esquire, merchant, of
Montreal, in 1876. She was identified with Liberal associations and interests in the West of Scotland. Their eldest son was Sir Thomas Glen-Coats, 2nd Baronet, an Olympic sailor.
In July 1902, their daughter opened the new sanatorium for consumptives at Athronhill, Scotland. The family donated $10,000 to the London Cancer Research Fund.

References

External links 
 

1846 births
1922 deaths
Scottish Liberal Party MPs
Members of the Parliament of the United Kingdom for Scottish constituencies
UK MPs 1906–1910
Baronets in the Baronetage of the United Kingdom
Companions of the Order of the Bath
Lord-Lieutenants of Renfrewshire